Štefan Olekšák (16 January 1940 – 1 December 1996) was a Slovak skier. He competed in the Nordic combined event at the 1964 Winter Olympics.

References

External links
 

1940 births
1996 deaths
Slovak male Nordic combined skiers
Olympic Nordic combined skiers of Czechoslovakia
Nordic combined skiers at the 1964 Winter Olympics
People from Poprad District
Sportspeople from the Prešov Region